The 2017–18 Iran Super League season was the 28th season of the Iranian basketball league.

Regular season

Standings

Results

Playoffs

Quarterfinals
The higher-seeded team played the first, second and fifth leg (if necessary) at home.

|}

Semifinals
The higher-seeded team played the first, second and fifth leg (if necessary) at home.

|}

Third place
The higher-seeded team played the first, second and fifth leg (if necessary) at home.

|}

Final
The higher-seeded team played the first, second and fifth leg (if necessary) at home.

|}

References
 Asia Basket
 Iranian Basketball Federation

Iranian Basketball Super League seasons
Iran